Queisser is a German surname. Notable people with the surname include:

 Hans-Joachim Queisser (born 1931), German physicist
 Karl Traugott Queisser (1800–1846), German trombone and viola player

German-language surnames